Tropidosteptes amoenus, the ash plant bug, is a species of plant bug in the family Miridae. It is found in North America.

Subspecies
These six subspecies belong to the species Tropidosteptes amoenus:
 Tropidosteptes amoenus amoenus Reuter, 1909
 Tropidosteptes amoenus atriscutis (Knight, 1929)
 Tropidosteptes amoenus floridanus (Knight, 1929)
 Tropidosteptes amoenus plagiatus Reuter, 1909
 Tropidosteptes amoenus scutellaris Reuter, 1909
 Tropidosteptes amoenus signatus Reuter, 1909

References

Further reading

 

Articles created by Qbugbot
Insects described in 1909
Tropidosteptes